Snehal Gaware, a resident of Dombivili, Thane, Maharashtra, in India, was murdered on 20 July 2007, allegedly by her boyfriend.

Murder 
Gaware was studying at the Sardar Patel College of Engineering, Andheri. She lived with her parents in Dombivili, at the Ninad Society where she had been recuperating from a leg injury in June 2007. On 20 July 2007, she was missing from home when her mother returned. The following day, Gaware's body was found with her mouth gagged, and her hands and legs tied in the drawer of her bed.

Aftermath
Gaware's boyfriend, was arrested and charged with her murder in April 2010. He had continued his education in the United States in the meantime. Police dropped the charges the following year, citing a lack of evidence.

See also
2008 Noida double murder case
List of unsolved murders

References

2000s missing person cases
2007 murders in India
Crime in Maharashtra
Formerly missing people
July 2007 events in India
Gaware, Snehal
People murdered in Mumbai
Andheri
Female murder victims
Violence against women in India